Suleiman I may refer to:
 Suleiman-Shah (d. 1161), Sultan of the Great Seljuq Empire
 Suleiman ibn Qutulmish (d. 1086), founder of the Sultanate of Rum
 Süleyman Çelebi (1377–1411), co-ruler of the Ottoman Empire
 Suleiman the Magnificent (1494–1566), 10th Sultan of the Ottoman Empire
 Suleiman I of Persia (1648–1694), 8th Shah of the Safavid Empire

See also
Suleiman